In enzymology, a nicotinate phosphoribosyltransferase is an enzyme that catalyzes the chemical reaction

nicotinate + 5-phospho-α-D-ribose 1-diphosphate + ATP + H2O  nicotinate D-ribonucleotide + diphosphate + ADP + phosphate

Thus, the four substrates of this enzyme are nicotinate, 5-phospho-alpha-D-ribose 1-diphosphate, ATP, and H2O, whereas its four products are nicotinate D-ribonucleotide, diphosphate, ADP, and phosphate.

This enzyme belongs to the family of ligases, specifically those forming generic carbon-nitrogen bonds.  The systematic name of this enzyme class is 5-phospho-alpha-D-ribose 1-diphosphate:nicotinate ligase (ADP, diphosphate-forming) .

Structural studies

References

 
 
 

EC 6.3.4
Enzymes of known structure